Cristiana Cascioli (born 10 August 1975) is an Italian former fencer. She competed in the women's individual épée events at the 2000 and 2004 Summer Olympics.

References

External links
 

1975 births
Living people
People from Narni
Italian female fencers
Olympic fencers of Italy
Fencers at the 2000 Summer Olympics
Fencers at the 2004 Summer Olympics
Sportspeople from the Province of Terni
Mediterranean Games gold medalists for Italy
Mediterranean Games medalists in fencing
Competitors at the 2001 Mediterranean Games
20th-century Italian women
21st-century Italian women